The Wilmington Oil Field is a prolific petroleum field in Los Angeles County in southern California in the United States. Discovered in 1932, it is the third largest oil field in the United States in terms of cumulative oil production. The field runs roughly southeast to northwest through the Los Angeles Basin, stretching from the middle of San Pedro Bay through Long Beach and east of the Palos Verdes Peninsula.

The offshore portion of the oil field is developed largely through wells drilled directionally from THUMS Islands, four artificial islands in Long Beach Harbor.

Operations
California Resources Corporation currently operates the Wilmington Oil Field in partnership with the State of California and the City of Long Beach. CRC's Long Beach operations include:
THUMS Long Beach Company, which operates the offshore portion of the Wilmington Oil Field
Tidelands Oil Production Company, which operates the onshore portion of the Wilmington Oil Field
two additional smaller leases in the Long Beach area

Data
Estimations as of 2013 (based on reserve estimates in 2008 and extraction from succeeding years, estimated through July).
 cumulative production:  
 estimated reserves: 
 annual production:  
 producing wells: 1,428 (in 2008)
 estimated year of depletion (based on current rates and reserve estimates): 2031

Geology

The field was discovered with the Ranger Petroleum Corp.'s Watson No. 2 well in 1932, which flowed at 150 bbl per day, and the broad anticline structure itself was discovered in 1936 by the General Petroleum Corp.'s Terminal No. 1 well based on a Reflection seismology survey.  An offshore seismic survey in 1954 showed the field extended some miles to the southeast. The anticline plunges to the northwest and is separated from the Torrance Oil Field by a saddle, and is similarly separated from the Huntington Beach Oil Field to the southeast. A series of transform faults divides the field into separate blocks which form barriers to fluid movement and pressure changes.  Basement consists of the Catalina Schist and is overlain with up to 8,000 feet of Miocene and Pliocene sediments, the main oil producing zones being the Puente and Repetto sandstones. An unconformity in the Pliocene between the Repetto and the Pico indicates the top of the structure was eroded to a flat surface and later Pliocene and Holocene sediments were deposited horizontally.

Subsidence
Withdrawal of large volumes of oil from the poorly consolidated sediments resulted in compaction of the oil reservoirs, and resultant sinking of the overlying land surface. Subsidence became apparent in 1940, and exceeded 20 feet at the center. Water injection to maintain pressure in the oil reservoirs began in 1953, which eventually stopped further subsidence.

References

External links
Los Angeles Almanac: Great Oil Fields
NASA: Land subsidence in Long Beach from petroleum extraction

Oil fields in California
Geology of Los Angeles County, California
Geography of Los Angeles
Geography of Long Beach, California
Geography of Los Angeles County, California
Los Angeles Harbor Region
Terminal Island
Wilmington, Los Angeles
Economy of Los Angeles
Economy of Long Beach, California